Head Island is a small island that lies  south of Andrews Point and close to the northeast side of Anvers Island, Antarctica. The feature is situated at the southeast side of Hackapike Bay and is not to be confused with Pear Island and False Island which are just northeastward. Head Island was charted from the Penola by the British Graham Land Expedition (1934–37) under John Rymill. The name is presumed to be descriptive and dates back to about 1952.

See also 
 List of Antarctic and sub-Antarctic islands

References

Islands of the Palmer Archipelago